Slippery Rock may refer to the following:

Slippery Rock, Pennsylvania, a borough in Butler County
Slippery Rock Creek, a tributary of the Beaver River in Pennsylvania
Slippery Rock University, Pennsylvania, a census-designated place
Slippery Rock University of Pennsylvania
Slippery Rock Township, Butler County, Pennsylvania
Slippery Rock Township, Lawrence County, Pennsylvania

See also
Slippery Rock Gorge Trail